Reepham may refer to:

Reepham, Lincolnshire
Reepham, Norfolk

See also 
 Reepham railway station (disambiguation)